Janko Popović may refer to:

 Cincar-Janko
 Janko Popović Volarić